Eastern California is a region defined as either the strip to the east of the crest of the Sierra Nevada or as the easternmost counties of  California.

Demographics
According to the 2010 census, the population of the eastern border counties of California was 5,129,384. However, 4,224,851 (82.4%) lived in San Bernardino and Riverside counties, which are very large and whose populations are concentrated near Los Angeles and Orange counties to the southwest.

Culture and history 

Eastern California's history differs significantly from that of the coastal regions and the Central Valley. Northeastern California is very sparsely populated (except for the area around Lake Tahoe): the three least-populated counties of California lie in the northeast. The area tends to be politically conservative, much like the rest of the rural Western United States. However, the counties of San Bernardino and Riverside form the 13th-largest metropolitan area of the United States, and El Dorado and Placer Counties are part of the Greater Sacramento area and are culturally influenced by their respective metropolitan areas. Imperial County in the Southeast, though rural and agrarian, is heavily Democratic and has ties with the Mexicali Valley to the south.

Northeastern California has had strong ties to Nevada, with the exact boundary between the two states having once been a matter of dispute. Residents of an area near Susanville, California tried to break away from the state in 1856, first by declaring themselves part of the Nataqua Territory and then through annexation to Nevada. The two states further squabbled over ownership of Susanville in 1863. The town of Aurora, Nevada, was temporarily the county seat of both Mono County, California, and Esmeralda County, Nevada. Finally, the line between the two states was settled by a survey in 1892. Over time, droughts and wildfires have increased in frequency and become less seasonal and more year-round, further straining the region's water security.

There are many unique historical aspects of Eastern California including the Manzanar internment camp and the historical Carson and Colorado Railway.

Geography 
The easternmost counties of California are (from north to south):

 Modoc County
 Lassen County
 Plumas County
 Sierra County
 Nevada County
 Placer County
 El Dorado County
 Alpine County
 Mono County
 Inyo County
 San Bernardino County
 Riverside County
 Imperial County

Cities within this region include San Bernardino, Riverside, Ontario, Corona, Rancho Cucamonga, Roseville, Victorville, Temecula, Palm Springs, Lincoln, El Centro, Barstow, South Lake Tahoe, Susanville, Truckee, Grass Valley, Placerville, and Alturas.

Cities larger than 50,000 population
The following incorporated places have a population of 50,000 or greater, according to the 2020 census:

Placer County 

Roseville: 147,773	
Rocklin: 71,601

San Bernardino County 

Apple Valley: 75,791	
Chino: 91,403
Chino Hills: 78,411
Colton: 53,909
Fontana: 208,393
Hesperia: 99,818	
Highland: 56,999	
Ontario: 175,265	
Rancho Cucamonga: 174,453	
Redlands: 73,168	
Rialto: 104,026	
San Bernardino: 222,101	
Upland: 79,040
Victorville: 134,810	
Yucaipa: 54,542

Riverside County 

Beaumont: 53,036
Cathedral City: 51,493
Corona: 157,136	
Eastvale: 69,757	
Hemet: 89,833	
Indio: 89,137	
Jurupa Valley: 105,053
Lake Elsinore: 70,265
Menifee: 102,527
Moreno Valley: 208,634
Murrieta: 110,949	
Palm Desert: 51,163	
Perris: 78,700
Riverside: 314,998
San Jacinto: 53,898
Temecula: 110,003

Geology

Because Eastern California is generally in the rain shadow of the Sierra Nevada or the Transverse Ranges, the climate is extremely dry and can be considered a desert. Indeed, the hottest and lowest area in North America lies in Death Valley, in the heart of Eastern California.

Geologically, Eastern California is mostly part of the Basin and Range Province, marked by crustal extension, with horsts and grabens. Volcanism is also evident in this region.

Climate 

The majority of Eastern California experiences two seasons, a long, dry summer and a milder winter in which the rain is concentrated. Most higher elevations experience four distinct seasons. There are some areas where the weather is very diverse. The Sierra Nevada mountain range has larger amounts of snowfall, while the Imperial Valley has more arid conditions.
With its low and often sporadic rainfall, California is susceptible to drought, and in many parts of the state including Eastern California, there is very high fire danger and there have been several devastating wildfires.

Economy 

The northern counties of Eastern California are heavily timbered areas. The timber industry is a major contributor to the economy from sale of timber and forest products and the number of jobs that it provides. These timbered areas not only provide valuable income, but are also the main growing sector for the economy for recreation and tourism. In the Sierra Nevada National Forests they experience 50 million recreational visitor days per year. When California became a state, it was one of the leading producers of these timber and forest products. Since then, it has held the third place for the top producer of softwoods since the 1940s. In California there were five counties that contributed to 55 percent of the wood harvested for the state. One of those counties, Plumas, is located in Eastern California.

Transportation

Major highways

Modoc County
 U.S. Route 395
 State Route 139
 State Route 299
Lassen County
 U.S. Route 395
 State Route 36
 State Route 44
 State Route 139
 State Route 299
Plumas County
 State Route 36
 State Route 49
 State Route 70
 State Route 89
 State Route 284
Sierra County
 U.S. Route 395
 Interstate 80
 State Route 49
 State Route 89
Nevada County
 Interstate 80
 State Route 20
 State Route 49
 State Route 89
 State Route 174
Placer County
 Interstate 80
 State Route 28
 State Route 49
 State Route 65
 State Route 89
 State Route 174
 State Route 267
El Dorado County
 U.S. Route 50
 State Route 49
 State Route 89
 State Route 193
Luther Pass
Alpine County
 State Route 4
 State Route 88
 State Route 89
Mono County
 U.S. Route 6
 U.S. Route 395
 State Route 108
 State Route 120
 State Route 158
 State Route 167
 State Route 182
 State Route 270
Inyo County
 U.S. Route 6
 U.S. Route 395
 State Route 127
 State Route 136
 State Route 168
 State Route 178
 State Route 190
San Bernardino County

Riverside County

 U.S. Route 95
 Historic U.S. Route 99
 Historic U.S. Route 395
 State Route 60
 State Route 62
 State Route 71
 State Route 74
 State Route 78
 State Route 79
 State Route 86
 State Route 91
 State Route 111
 State Route 177
 State Route 243
 State Route 371

Educational Institutions

Private institutions

 William Jessup University 
 Brandman University 
 National University (campuses in Ontario and San Bernardino)
 Deep Springs College
 Loma Linda University
 University of Redlands

Community Colleges

 Lassen Community College 
 Feather River College 
 Sierra College 
 Folsom Lake College 
 Lake Tahoe Community College
 Cerro Coso Community College
 Palo Verde Community College 
 Barstow Community College
 Chaffey College
 Copper Mountain College
 Crafton Hills College
 San Bernardino Valley College
 University of La Verne
 Victor Valley College
 Mt. San Jacinto College
 College of the Desert

Public Institutions

 California State University, San Bernardino
 University of California, Riverside

National Parks

Death Valley National Park
Lassen National Park
Lava Beds National Monument
Devils Postpile
Manzanar
Mojave National Preserve
Old Spanish National Historic Trail
Tule Lake Unit, World War II Valor in the Pacific National Monument
Joshua Tree National Park

See also 
 Deserts of California

References

Further reading
 
 
 
 

 

Regions of California
Deserts of California